David William Huddleston (September 17, 1930 – August 2, 2016) was an American actor. An Emmy Award nominee, Huddleston had a prolific television career, and appeared in many films including: Rio Lobo, Blazing Saddles, Crime Busters, Santa Claus: The Movie, and The Big Lebowski.

Early life
Huddleston was born in Vinton, Virginia, the son of Ismay Hope (née Dooley) and Lewis Melvin Huddleston. Huddleston attended Fork Union Military Academy for high school (Class of 1949) and is listed among the school's prominent alumni. He was briefly an officer in the United States Air Force before beginning his formal education in acting at the American Academy of Dramatic Arts.

Career
Known mainly as a character actor, Huddleston starred in the title role of 1985's big-budget film Santa Claus: The Movie, which featured a top-billed Dudley Moore as an elf. One of Huddleston's first roles came in the 1968 drama A Lovely Way to Die. Shortly afterward the actor became a frequent guest star on several of the leading television series of the 1960s and 1970s, among them, Adam-12, Then Came Bronson, Gunsmoke, Bewitched, Bonanza, Columbo, Cannon, McMillan & Wife, The Waltons, The Rookies, Medical Center, Kung Fu, Emergency!, Spencer's Pilots, The Mary Tyler Moore Show, Police Woman, Hawaii Five-O, Walker, Texas Ranger, Charlie's Angels, Vega$, Sanford and Son, The Practice, and The Rockford Files. He appeared in many episodes of the TV series Petrocelli, as Lieutenant John Ponce during the series run from 1974 to 1976.   He appeared in an unaired episode of the short-lived 1974 series The New Land and in the episode "The Nomads" from the 1977 series Quinn Martin's Tales of the Unexpected (known in the United Kingdom as Twist in the Tale). He starred as J. T. Kallikak in the short-lived NBC situation comedy The Kallikaks later in 1977, and in 1979 he played the title role in the short-lived situation comedy Hizzonner as a small-town mayor. Among Huddleston's notable feature film credits prior to Santa Claus: The Movie are his co-starring roles in Blazing Saddles, McQ, The Klansman, Smokey and the Bandit II and Breakheart Pass.

Huddleston resumed his television career with roles in various television movies, among them Heat Wave! (1974); The Oregon Trail (1976); Shark Kill (1976); Kate Bliss and the Ticker Tape Kid (1978); Family Reunion (1981); Computercide (1982); and M.A.D.D.: Mothers Against Drunk Drivers (1983). For much of the 1980s, Huddleston also starred in a series of television commercials for the Citrus Hill brand of orange juice. Huddleston's post-Santa Claus career found him making occasional co-starring roles, in Spot Marks the X, Finnegan Begin Again, Frantic, Life with Mikey, The Big Lebowski in which he played the title role, and G-Men from Hell. Later, he also had a recurring role as Albert "Gramps" Arnold, the paternal grandfather of the protagonist in The Wonder Years. Huddleston appeared on Star Trek: The Next Generation as the train conductor in the episode "Emergence". He also appeared twice on The West Wing as Max Lobell, a Republican Senator who allies with Jed Bartlet on the issue of campaign finance reform.  His performance as Benjamin Franklin in a Boston stage production of 1776 is referenced in the book Assassination Vacation by Sarah Vowell, referring to him as "the actor who played The Big Lebowski in The Big Lebowski." In 2009 he appeared in the thriller Locker 13. Huddleston was also featured in the 2010 special It's Always Sunny in Philadelphia: It's a Very Sunny Christmas released directly to DVD, Blu-ray and Digital Download.

Death
On August 2, 2016, Huddleston died of heart and kidney disease in Santa Fe, New Mexico at the age of 85.

Filmography

Features

All the Way Home (1963) – Small Part (uncredited)
Black Like Me (1964)
A Lovely Way to Die (1968) – Man in Bar (uncredited)
Slaves (1969) – Holland
WUSA (1970) – Heavy Man (uncredited)
Norwood (1970) – Uncle Lonnie
Rio Lobo (1970) – Dr. Jones
Fools' Parade (1971) – Homer Grindstaff
Something Big (1971) – Malachi Morton
Brian's Song (1971, TV Movie) – Ed McCaskey
The Homecoming, A Christmas Story (1971, TV Movie) – Sheriff Ep Bridges
Bad Company (1972) – Big Joe
Country Blue (1973) – Angus Wages
McQ (1974) – Pinky
Heatwave! (1974, TV Movie) – Arnold Brady
Blazing Saddles (1974) – Olson Johnson
Billy Two Hats (1974) – Copeland
Nightmare Honeymoon (1974) – Pete Carroll
The Klansman (1974) – Mayor Hardy Riddle
Breakheart Pass (1975) – Dr. Molyneux
Sherlock Holmes in New York (1976, TV Movie) – Inspector Lafferty
Crime Busters (1977) – Captain McBride
The Greatest (1977) – Cruikshank
Capricorn One (1977) – Congressman Hollis Peaker
The World's Greatest Lover (1977) – Bakery Owner
Zero to Sixty (1978) – Harold Finch
Gorp (1980) – Walrus Wallman
Smokey and the Bandit II (1980) – John Conn
The Act (1983) – Corky
Go for It (1983) – Tiger
Finnegan Begin Again (1985, TV Movie) – Jack Archer
Santa Claus: The Movie (1985) – Santa Claus
Frantic (1988) – Peter
The Tracker (1988, TV Movie) – Lane Crawford
Life with Mikey (1993) – Mr. Corcoran
Cultivating Charlie (1994) – Ed Thundertrunk
Something to Talk About (1995) – Jack 'Mad Dog' Pierce (uncredited)
Joe's Apartment (1996) – P.I. Smith
The Man Next Door (1997) – Sheriff Dawkins
The Big Lebowski (1998) – The Big Lebowski
G-Men from Hell (2000) – Dr. Boifford
The Producers (2005) – Judge
Postal (2007) – Peter
Saving Grace B. Jones (2009) – Radio Announcer (voice)
Locker 13 (2009) – Floyd (segment "story #2") (final film role)

Television

Adam-12 – episode – Log 63: Baby – Station Attendant (1969)
Then Came Bronson – episode – Your Love Is Like a Demolition Derby in My Heart – Bear Hudson (1969) 
Bewitched – episode – Samantha's Pet Warlock – Dog Pound Attendant (1970) 
Bewitched – episode – Out of the Mouths of Babes – Sean Flanagan (1971)
Bonanza – episode – Bushwacked – Doc Scully (1971) 
Cannon – episode – Country Blues – Jimmy Winters (1971) 
Bewitched – episode – The Return of Darrin the Bold – Dave (1971)
McMillan & Wife – episode – Murder by the Barrel – Pylant (1971)
Gunsmoke – episode – Lavery – Arno (1971)
Ironside – episode – The Priest Killer – Harrison Davis (1971) 
Bonanza – episode – The Hidden Enemy – Myles Johnson (1972)
The Waltons – episode – The Literary Man – A. J. Covington (1972)
The New Dick Van Dyke Show – episode – He Who Steals My Friends – Gordon (1973)
Tenafly – episode – The Cash and Carry Caper (1973) 
Tenafly – episode – Pilot –  Lieutenant Sam Church (1973)
The New Perry Mason – episode – The Case of the Deadly Deeds – Stephen Elder (1973) 
Hawkins – episode – "Death and the Maiden" –  Joseph Harrelson (1973)
Kung Fu – episode – The Salamander – Nathaniel (1973)
Gunsmoke – episode – The Widowmaker – Dad Goodpastor (1973) 
The Mary Tyler Moore Show  – episode – What Are Friends For? – Freddy (1974) 
The Snoop Sisters – episode – A Black Day for Bluebeard – Arwin Shanks (1974)
Gunsmoke – episode – In Performance of Duty – Emmett (1974) 
Gunsmoke – episode – The Disciple – Asa (1974) 
Ironside – episode – Come Eleven, Come Twelve – Smithers (1974)
Paper Moon – episode – Impostor – Sheriff (1974) 
Petrocelli – 9 episodes – Lt. Ponce (1974–1976)
The Rockford Files – episode – The Reincarnation of Angie – Sherm (1975) 
Police Woman – episode – The Purge – Milton Brooks (1975) 
Emergency! – episode – 905-Wild –  Barney 'Doc' Coolidge (1975) 
Kung Fu – episode – One Step to Darkness – Shelby Cross (1975)
Barnaby Jones – episode – Jules Takes a Partner – Dr. Michael Harrigan (1976) 
Once an Eagle – TV Mini-Series – Earl Preis (1976) 
Spencer's Pilots – episode – The Explosives – Willie Hunt (1976) 
Charlie's Angels – episode – Angels in Chains – Sheriff Clint (1976) 
Hawaii Five-O – episode – Love Thy Neighbor, Take His Wife – Vincent Rhoads (1976)
Sanford and Son – episodes – The Hawaiian Connection: Parts 1 & 2 – First Cop (1976)
Barnaby Jones – episode – Copy-Cat Killing – Sheriff Roland G. Bradden (1977) 
The Kallikaks – SitCom – Jasper T. Kallikak (1977) 
How the West Was Won – TV Mini-Series – episodes – #1.1- #1.4 – Christy Judson (1977–1978)
Vega$ – episode – Mixed Blessings – Diamond Jim Oneal (1979)
Benson – Sitcom – Season One, episode 20 – Old Man Gatling (March 06, 1980)
Trapper John, M.D. – episode – Truth and Consequences: Parts 1 & 2 – Wallace Surtees (1982) 
Magnum, P.I. – episode – Going Home – Frank Peterson (1985)
J.J. Starbuck – episode – Pilot – Bullets (1987) 
Columbo – episode – Columbo Cries Wolf – The Mayor (1990) 
Murder, She Wrote – episode – Good-Bye Charlie – Sheriff Ed Ten Eyck (1990)
The Wonder Years – 4 episodes – Grandpa Arnold (1990–1992)
In a Child's Name – TV Mini-Series (1991) – Zach Taylor
Star Trek: The Next Generation – episode – Emergence – The Conductor (1994) 
Walker, Texas Ranger – episode – The Road to Black Bayou – Ferris Clayton (1994) 
The Great Christmas Movies – TV Movie documentary – Himself (1998)
The West Wing – episode – Lies, Damn Lies and Statistics – Sen. Max Lobell, R (2000)
Gilmore Girls – 2 episodes – Mayor Harry Porter (2000, 2001)
The West Wing – episode – Posse Comitatus – Sen. Max Lobell, R (2002)
Best Ever Christmas Films – TV Movie documentary – Himself (2005)
Andy Barker, P.I. – episode – Dial M for Laptop – George Bender (2007)
Jericho – Mayor Eric Green (flashbacks only) (2007)
It's Always Sunny In Philadelphia – episode – A Very Sunny Christmas – Eugene Hamilton (2009)
Gilmore Girls – episode – "Star-Crossed Lovers and Other Strangers" – Mayor Harry Porter

References

External links
 
 
 

1930 births
2016 deaths
American male film actors
American male television actors
Deaths from kidney disease
Male actors from Virginia
People from Vinton, Virginia
United States Air Force officers